The Sunny South is a 1887 painting by the Australian artist Tom Roberts.  The painting depicts a group of boys swimming naked at Ricketts Point at Beaumaris, Victoria, a suburb of Melbourne.

The painting was acquired by the National Gallery of Victoria in 1940 with funds from the Felton Bequest.

The title appears to be a triple entendre. The title refers to the popular show titled The Sunny South, which was a popular play first produced in Melbourne by George Darrell and starring Essie Jenyns in 1883, four years before the painting was finished, then taken to London. Ricketts Point, Beaumaris, is a seaside suburb to the south of Melbourne particularly popular during summertime. The third reference could be to the exposed backside of the central figure in the painting.

References

External links
The Sunny South at the National Gallery of Victoria

Paintings by Tom Roberts
1887 paintings
Paintings in the collection of the National Gallery of Victoria
Port Phillip
Paintings of children